is a 16th-century castle, located in Ōita city, Ōita Prefecture, Japan.  It was built by Ōtomo Sōrin in 1562, who owned much of the surrounding Kyūshū island.  The castle was originally built with several turrets (yagura), all of which were burnt down with the three story donjon in 1743.  The covered bridge that led to the castle over its moat, as well as several turrets, were rebuilt in the 20th century.  Original remains include part of the wall and the moat.

Literature

References

Castles in Ōita Prefecture
Lowland castles
Ogyū-Matsudaira clan